The 1978 Oakland Raiders season was the team's 19th season, and ninth as an NFL member. 

1978 would prove to be an up and down year for the silver and black. During a pre-season game, Jack Tatum paralyzed New England Patriots wide receiver Darryl Stingley from the chest down while making a hit. Overall, the Raiders were plagued by one of quarterback Kenny Stabler's worst seasons, tossing 16 TD's, while throwing 30 interceptions. The running game also fell off from seasons past. Even the great wide receiver Cliff Branch, only caught one touchdown. The season started off with a 14–6 loss in Denver. The Raiders would rally to a 5–3 start, then climbed to 8–4. As a result of a last-minute defeat to the Seattle Seahawks 17–16, the Raiders lost twice to a single team in the same season for the first time since 1965. The following week, the Broncos completed their sweep of the Raiders with a 21–6 victory in Oakland, which was followed by a 23–6 defeat in Miami which eliminated Oakland from the playoffs for the first time since 1971. A meaningless 27–20 victory over the Minnesota Vikings kept the Raiders consecutive seasons with a winning record streak alive. This was head coach John Madden's tenth and final season and final game as head coach of the Raiders. He was replaced for the 1979 season by his wide receivers coach, Tom Flores.

Offseason

NFL Draft

Roster

Regular season

Schedule

Game summaries

Week 2

The Holy Roller 
During this game, one of the most famous plays known as the Holy Roller occurred. Kenny Stabler fumbled the ball and Pete Banaszak moved it forward allowing Dave Casper to finish the job for a touchdown. It is one of the most controversial plays in the history of the NFL.

Week 3

Week 6 
TV Network: NBC
Announcers: Curt Gowdy and John Brodie
This game started with nearly all Oilers as future Raider Dan Pastorini throw touchdown passes of 58 yards to Mike Renfro and 17 yards to Mike Barber and Toni Fritsch kicked a 35-yard field goal. The only Raiders points in the first 3 quarters was a 4-yard touchdown run by Arthur Whittington. Then with the Oilers leading 17-7 lead and driving deep in Raiders' territory, Oiler running back Earl Campbell ran around left tackle and lost the ball when Oakland's Dave Browning hit him, and Charles Phillips picked up the ball and ran it 96 yards to cut the Oilers lead to 3. Then in quarter four, and late Ken Stabler who had 3 interceptions prior to this drive suddenly came to life as he successfully passes 71 of the 80 yards ending with a pass to Dave Casper. Oiler defender Greg Stemrick got his hands on the short winning pass, but Casper yanked the ball loose and held on for the score. His four-yard touchdown reception helped the Raiders go to 4-2 and a tie for first with Denver in the AFC West standings.

Standings

Awards and honors

References 

 Raiders on Pro Football Reference
 Raiders on Database Football

Oakland
Oakland Raiders seasons
Oakland